was a  after Kan'ei and before Keian. This period spanned the years from December 1644 through February 1648.

Change of era
 1644 : The era name was changed to Shōhō to mark the enthronement of the new emperor Go-Kōmyō. The previous era ended and a new one commenced in Kan'ei 21, on the 16th day of the 12th month.

Events of the Shōhō era
 1644 (Shōhō 1): The third major map of Japan was ordered by the Shogunate—the first having been completed in Keichō 10—at a scale of 1:432,000 (based on maps of the provinces drawn to a scale of 1:21,600).
 June 13, 1645 (Shōhō 2, 19th day of the 5th month): Death of Miyamoto Musashi.
 December 1645 (Shōhō 3): Death of Takuan Sōhō, a leading figure in the Zen reform movement.
 January 18, 1646 (Shōhō 2, 2nd day of the 12th month): Death of Hosokawa Tadaoki.
 May 11, 1646 (Shōhō 3, 26th day of the 3rd month): Death of Yagyū Munenori.
 1648 (Shōhō 6): The shogunate issues a legal code governing the lives of commoners in Edo.

Notes

References
 Hall, John Whitney. (1997). The Cambridge History of Japan: Early Modern Japan. Cambridge: Cambridge University Press. ; 
 Nussbaum, Louis Frédéric and Käthe Roth. (2005). Japan Encyclopedia. Cambridge: Harvard University Press. ; OCLC 48943301
 Screech, Timon. (2006). Secret Memoirs of the Shoguns: Isaac Titsingh and Japan, 1779–1822. London: RoutledgeCurzon. ; OCLC 65177072
 Titsingh, Isaac. (1834). Nihon Ōdai Ichiran; ou,  Annales des empereurs du Japon.  Paris: Royal Asiatic Society, Oriental Translation Fund of Great Britain and Ireland. OCLC 5850691
 Traganeou, Jilly. (2004). The Tokaido Road: Traveling and Representation in Edo and Meiji Japan. London: RoutledgeCurzon.

External links
 National Diet Library, "The Japanese Calendar" -- historical overview plus illustrative images from library's collection
 National Archives of Japan map of Edo in the 1st or 2nd year of Shōhō (1644 or 1645)

Japanese eras
1640s in Japan